The Sports Writers Association of Ghana (SWAG) is professional body in Ghana that includes as sports journalist, analysts, commentators and recognized sports associations in Ghana. The Association holds the SWAG night every year where the best sport Ghanaian sport personalities, clubs and cooperate institutions involved in sports development and promotion are honoured. The association was formed in 1968.  In 2011, Asamoah Gyan won the sportsman of the year award, in recognition of his contribution to the Black Stars.

Presidents 
The following individuals have served as President of the Sport Writers Association of Ghana (SWAG);

References

External links 

 

Sports organisations of Ghana
Professional associations based in Ghana
Ghanaian sportswriters
Organizations established in 1968
Ghana